Oľdza is a village and municipality in the Dunajská Streda District in the Trnava Region of south-west Slovakia.

Geography
The municipality lies at an altitude of 126 metres and covers an area of 8.861 km2.

History
The village was first recorded in 1239 as Olgia. Until the end of World War I, it was part of Hungary and fell within the Somorja district of Pozsony County. After the Austro-Hungarian army disintegrated in November 1918, Czechoslovak troops liberated the area. After the Treaty of Trianon of 1920, the village became officially part of Czechoslovakia. In November 1938, the First Vienna Award granted the area to Hungary and it was held and occupied by Hungary until 1945. After Soviet liberation in 1945, Czechoslovak administration returned and the village became officially part of Czechoslovakia in 1947.

Demography 
In 1910, the village had 209, for the most part, Hungarian inhabitants. At the 2001 Census the recorded population of the village was 258 while an end-2008 estimate by the Statistical Office had the villages's population as 344. As of 2001, 93.80% of its population was Hungarian while 5.43% was Slovak. Roman Catholicism is the majority religion of the village, its adherents numbering 94.19% of the total population. Due to the large development of new houses in the village since 2007, the Slovak population became major part of the population (51%).

References 

Villages and municipalities in Dunajská Streda District
Hungarian communities in Slovakia